Sphodromantis baccettii is a species of praying mantis found in Kenya and Somalia.  It may be distinguished from Sphodromantis lineola by the presence of blue-black spots on its forearms.

See also
African mantis
List of mantis genera and species

References

B
Mantodea of Africa
Insects of Kenya
Insects of Somalia
Insects described in 1987